Acrocercops ramigera is a moth of the family Gracillariidae. It is found in Brazil.

References

ramigera
Gracillariidae of South America
Moths described in 1920